myxRadio (stylized as myxRADIO) is a 24-hour commercial-free Top 40
radio station owned by ABS-CBN Corporation and operated in partnership with digital radio platform Dash Radio.

History and profile
The station began its operations in beta on November 1, 2019. It was officially launched on November 27, 2019, the night before Thanksgiving Day, at the 143Thx Music Festival in Los Angeles.

Initially, the station features a lineup of weekly programming dedicated to hip hop and pop music by Filipino and Asian American artists around the world. It has over 3 million monthly listeners in the United States and Canada.

Myx Radio is also available on ABS-CBN Radio Service App.

See also
 Myx TV
 Myx (Philippines)
 Dash Radio
 Filipino Americans

References

ABS-CBN International
Filipino-American culture in California
Internet radio in the United States
Radio stations established in 2019
Assets owned by ABS-CBN Corporation